Louis Liotti (born May 25, 1985) is an American former professional ice hockey defenseman. He last played with KS Cracovia in the Polska Liga Hokejowa.

Playing career
Liotti played junior hockey with the Sioux City Musketeers in the United States Hockey League.

Liotti attended the Northeastern University where he played four seasons (2005 – 2009) in NCAA's Hockey East conference with the Northeastern Huskies men's ice hockey team. In his senior year Liotti was recognized for his outstanding play when he was named the Hockey East Best Defensive Defenseman.

He subsequently signed a contract with the Worcester Sharks to make his professional debut in the American Hockey League during the 2009–10 season.

On July 9, 2012, Liotti opted to leave North America and sign his first European contract with Danish club, EfB Ishockey of the AL-Bank Ligaen. Liotti assumed a prominent role with Esbjerg scoring 19 points in 36 games from the blueline.

Prior to the 2013–14 season, Liotti returned to North America and attended the Utica Comets inaugural training camp. After his release he was signed to a one-year contract with Italian club, WSV Sterzing Broncos of the Elite.A on October 13, 2013.

Career statistics

Awards and honors

References

External links

1985 births
Living people
American men's ice hockey defensemen
Bridgeport Sound Tigers players
EfB Ishockey players
Kalamazoo Wings (ECHL) players
Lake Erie Monsters players
Northeastern Huskies men's ice hockey players
Reading Royals players
Sioux City Musketeers players
Worcester Sharks players
People from Westbury, New York
Ice hockey players from New York (state)